Jefferson Schools is a public school district in Monroe County in the U.S. state of Michigan. The district encompasses portions of Frenchtown Charter Township (including Detroit Beach, Woodland Beach, and Stony Point) and Berlin Charter Township (including Estral Beach).

Schools

Elementary schools
Harold F. Sodt Elementary School Principal:  Tara Roe
North Elementary School Principal:  Marie Mincher

Secondary schools
Jefferson Middle School:  Principal:  Sara Griffin      Assistant Principal:  Gerald Dyson
Jefferson High School:  Interim Principal:  Millie Grow      Assistant Principal:  Jonathan Scharf

References

External links
Jefferson Schools

School districts in Michigan
Education in Monroe County, Michigan